F805 may refer to:

 , a K-class sloop designed for the Royal Netherlands Navy in the late 1930s
 , a  built for the Royal Netherlands Navy in the 1960s
 , a De Zeven Provinciën-class frigate of the Royal Netherlands Navy, launched in 2003